The Talofofo Falls are a scenic series of cascades on the Ugum River on the island of Guam. They are located in the southeast of the island, inland from Talofofo Bay.

References
Bendure, G. & Friary, N. (1988) Micronesia:A travel survival kit. South Yarra, VIC: Lonely Planet.

Geography of Guam
Talofofo, Guam
Waterfalls of the United States